Final standings of the 1901 Hungarian League season. This was the first ever football championship held in Hungary, and only Budapest based teams participated.

Final standings

Results

External links
 IFFHS link

Nemzeti Bajnokság I seasons
1901 in Hungarian football
Hun
Hun